Syrian Revolution General Commission (SRGC) is a Syrian coalition of 40 Syrian opposition groups to unite their efforts during the Syrian civil war that was announced on 19 August 2011 in Istanbul, Turkey.

According to an initial statement, the long-term aim of the coalition is to build "a democratic and civil state of institutions that grants freedom, equality, dignity and respect of human rights to all citizens".

It has been described as having an "aggressive platform" for the removal of president Bashar al-Assad, of "actively supporting armed rebels through provincial military councils", and of refusing to cooperate with the Syrian National Council (SNC) -- unlike the two other Syrian opposition groups the Supreme Council of the Syrian Revolution (SCSR), and the Local Coordination Committees (LCCs).   It reportedly refuses to cooperate with the SNC (the umbrella opposition group operating in exile),  "due to disillusionment with the SNC's endless internal power squabbles".

See also
Civil uprising phase of the Syrian Civil War
Syrian Revolution Network
Syrian Revolution Coordinators Union
Local Coordination Committees of Syria
Syrian National Council
National Coalition for Syrian Revolutionary and Opposition Forces

References

External links
Official Facebook page

2011 establishments in Syria
Organizations of the Syrian civil war
Political opposition organizations
Political party alliances in Syria
Politics of Syria
Syrian opposition